Pyotr Velikiy is the fourth  of the Russian Navy. It was initially named Yuri Andropov after the former General Secretary of the Communist Party, but the ship's name was changed after the fall of the Soviet Union. The Russian designation for the type is "heavy nuclear missile cruiser", but Western defense commentators have resurrected the term "battlecruiser" to describe them, as they are the largest surface "line of battle" warships in the world. Pyotr Velikiy is the flagship of the Northern Fleet.

Construction of the ship was delayed by lack of funding due to the national economic problems before and after the fall of the Soviet Union. It was not completed and commissioned until 1998, twelve years after work had started. By then it had been renamed Pyotr Velikiy, Russian for Peter the Great. Pyotr Velikiy has been known to carry two pennant numbers during its service: "183" and currently "099".

Service history
After completing its acceptance trials in November 1996, the vessel was transferred to the Northern Fleet at Severomorsk and was designated as the flagship of the Northern Fleet.

In August 2000, Pyotr Velikiy was in the Barents Sea to oversee the largest naval training exercise in a decade, since the fall of the Soviet Union. The ship was to be the designated target of the Oscar-II class submarine K-141 Kursk, and was conducting evasive maneuvers when communication with Kursk was lost. The submarine was later found to have suffered catastrophic torpedo detonations, resulting in the loss of all 118 crew members. Pyotr Velikiy guarded the area where the submarine sank during the subsequent salvage operation in 2001.

In March 2004, Russian Navy Chief Admiral Vladimir Kuroyedov declared Pyotr Velikiy unfit for service due to problems with the ship's engineering maintenance. On 19 April 2004, the cruiser was docked in the floating drydock PD-50 for painting of the underside of the hull, repairs, and examination of the steering system. The repairs were completed later that year, and it was carrying out missions again by August.

From September 21 to October 22, 2004 she sailed on her first long voyage. Accompanying the aircraft carrier , the destroyers Admiral Chabanenko and Admiral Ushakov, as well as several auxiliary ships, she went into the north-western Atlantic in what was the largest Russian naval exercise after the end of the Cold War.

2008–2009 

On 8 September 2008, it was announced that Pyotr Velikiy would sail to the Caribbean Sea to participate in naval exercises with the Venezuelan Navy, along with the destroyer  and other support ships. This action would represent the first major Russian show of force in the Caribbean since the end of the Cold War. On 22 September Pyotr Velikiy and Admiral Chabanenko left their homeport of Severomorsk.

On 22 October 2008 Pyotr Velikiy made a port visit to Aksaz Karagac, Turkey and on 6–9 November the cruiser and Admiral Chabanenko made a port visit to Toulon, France, before departing the Mediterranean on 10 November, passing through the Strait of Gibraltar.

Pyotr Velikiy arrived in La Guaira, Venezuela on 25 November 2008 coinciding with a visit by Russian President Dmitry Medvedev. A combined exercise, VENRUS-200, with the Venezuelan Navy took place on 1–2 December 2008.
After finishing the exercises, Admiral Chabanenko made a short visit to Panama 5–10 December, then to Bluefields, Nicaragua from 13 to 15 December and sailed into Havana, Cuba on 19 December.

Pyotr Velikiy continued alone to Cape Town, South Africa. On 11 January 2009, the chief of the Russian General Staff announced that Pyotr Velikiy and six other Russian warships would participate in a joint naval exercise with the Indian Navy later the same month. The Kirov-class cruiser paused for three days to visit Cape Town before continuing on to India.

On 31 January Pyotr Velikiy left the port of Mormugao in the Indian state of Goa. After a two-day visit that included a naval exercise with the Indian guided-missile destroyer  the cruiser left for African waters where the vessel joined other warships from the Russian navy and conduct the INDRA-2009 exercise.

On 12 February, the ship captured ten pirates in three boats off the coast of Somalia.

On 10 March, Pyotr Velikiy returned to its homeport of Severomorsk, ending a six-month deployment.

2010 

On 30 March 2010 Pyotr Velikiy left the Northern Fleet for a new six-month deployment. During its six-month tour of duty, the warship passed through the Atlantic Ocean and the Mediterranean Sea before entering the Indian Ocean via the Suez Canal. In the Indian Ocean the cruiser conducted maneuvers with other Russian warships from the Black Sea Fleet.

On 14 April the missile cruiser visited the Mediterranean port of Tartus in Syria. In September 2008, Russia was reported to be in talks with Syria about turning Tartus into a permanent base for Russian warships in the Middle East.

In early May 2010 Pyotr Velikiy met up with the cruiser  in the South China Sea. There they conducted joint exercises and held a traditional farewell ceremony on 5 May. The two vessels were due to arrive in Russia's Far Eastern port of Vladivostok to take part in the Vostok-2010 large-scale strategic exercise.

On 29 September Pyotr Velikiy returned to its home base in the Northern Fleet after six months at sea. The flagship of the Northern Fleet had covered about  since the beginning of the mission on 30 March.

2013 
During early September 2013 Pyotr Velikiy led a flotilla of Russian Navy ships through the Russian portion of the Northern Sea Route in preparation for establishment of regular patrols.

2014 

Pyotr Velikiy along with the aircraft carrier  and the tankers Sergey Osipov, Kama and Dubna; the tugboat Altay, and the Ropucha-class landing ship Minsk (122) entered the English Channel to sail north. The British destroyer  monitored the Russian task group as it neared the United Kingdom. Once the ships spotted each other they sailed briefly close by as a standard 'meet and greet'.

Pyotr Velikiy participated with Chinese frigate Yancheng (546) and western vessels in the destruction of Syria's chemical weapons.

2016 

In May 2016 Pyotr Velikiy put to sea for the first time in two years for drills off the coast of Northern Russia.
On 15 October Pyotr Velikiy left Severomorsk to escort Admiral Kuznetsov to the Mediterranean along with supply ships and two Udaloy class destroyers, Severomorsk and Vice-Admiral Kulakov. They were heading to the Eastern Mediterranean to support Syrian government forces battling rebel troops in Aleppo. Pyotr Velikiy passed through the Norwegian Sea and the English Channel, along with the rest of the Russian Northern Fleet on 21 October, shadowed by the British destroyer HMS Dragon.

2017 

On July 17., 2017 Pyotr Velikiy left Severomorsk together with Dmitry Donskoy, a support vessel and a frigate to participate in the Russian Navy Day celebrations in Kronstadt.  The convoy went through Storebælt, the only Danish strait deep enough for the Donskoy.

2019 

On 6 April 2019, the ship entered Barents Sea with cruiser Marshal Ustinov and several nuclear submarines.

On 10 October 2019, she went into Barents Sea with some 15 other warships, submarines, and auxiliary ships to conduct large-scale drills.

2020

On 29 May 2020, she went to Barents Sea for exercise.

On 11 July, Pyotr Veliky along with cruiser Marshal Ustinov held an exercise in the Barents Sea, both shooting Granit and Vulkan missiles, respectively.

2021 

On 24 May 2021 Pyotr Veliky went to sea along with some 10 other warships, including Marshal Ustinov. On 7 June, Pyotr Veliky was still reported at sea, taking part in a 20-ship strong exercise. 

On 1 July 2021, she went to sea again.

On 15 September, the cruiser conducted an exercise in the Barents Sea along with the cruiser Marshal Ustinov, both shooting Granit and Vulkan missiles, respectively.

2022

On 29 January, the cruiser conducted an air defence drill, without leaving the port.

On 15 February, Pyotr Veliky, frigate Admiral Gorshkov, diesel and nuclear submarines started an exercise in the Barents Sea.

Between 15 and 17 March 2022, she and destroyer Severomorsk held an exercise between Norway and Iceland, during the large-scale NATO naval exercise.

On 18 April 2022, Pyotr Veliky was at sea again, conducting an artillery exercise in the Barents Sea.

In June, the sailors started preparation for the Navy day parade in July.

Between 17 and 26 August 2022, Pyotr Veliky was at sea during a large-scale exercise and shot a Granit missile on 24 August. She was accompanied by destroyer Admiral Ushakov and an unknown number of submarines. At the same time, in the eastern part of the Barents Sea, destroyer Admiral Levchenko, LST Aleksandr Otrakovsky and tanker Sergey Osipov were active and embarked on a voyage eastwards along the Northern Sea Route. During the exercise, destroyer Severomorsk and LST Ivan Gren also passed through the Barents Sea on a way from the main naval parade in St. Petersburg to Severomorsk.

On 27 October 2022, she was underway in the Barents Sea. The cruiser went to sea again on 1 November.

Accident and incidents  
A Swedish Air Force pilot flying in a Saab 37 Viggen fighter-reconnaissance plane was scouting the Pyotr Velikiy in the Baltic Sea on 16 October 1996, when he suddenly flew into the water and died while trying to avoid a nearby Russian aircraft during the fly-by reconnaissance of the Russian ship.

Gallery

References

External links 

 Kirov class at the Federation of American Scientists
 

Kirov-class battlecruisers
Ships built in the Soviet Union
1996 ships
Nuclear ships of the Soviet Navy
Cruisers of Russia
Ships of the Russian Northern Fleet
Kursk submarine disaster
Russian involvement in the Syrian civil war
Ships built at the Baltic Shipyard